Dennis Zachariasson (born 25 June 1974) is a former Danish cricketer.  Zachariasson was a right-handed batsman who bowled right-arm medium.  He was born in Copenhagen, Copenhagen County.

Zachariasson made his List A debut for Denmark in the 1999 NatWest Trophy against the Kent Cricket Board.  He represented Denmark in 2 further List A matches, both of which came in the English domestic one-day competition, against the Durham Cricket Board in the 2000 NatWest Trophy and the Leicestershire Cricket Board in the 1st round of the 2003 Cheltenham & Gloucester Trophy which was held in 2002.  In his 3 List A matches for Denmark, he scored 20 runs in two unbeaten innings, with a top score of 16*.  With the ball he took a single wicket at a bowling average of 65.00, with best figures of 1/22.

References

External links
Dennis Zachariasson at ESPNcricinfo
Dennis Zachariasson at CricketArchive

1974 births
Living people
Sportspeople from Copenhagen
Danish cricketers